The 2017 NCAA Division I men's soccer tournament (also known as the 2017 College Cup) was the 59th annual single-elimination tournament to determine the national champion of NCAA Division I men's collegiate soccer. The first, second, third, and quarterfinal rounds were held at college campus sites across the United States during November and December 2017, with host sites determined by seeding and record. The four-team College Cup finals were played at Talen Energy Stadium in Chester, Pennsylvania on December 8 and 10.

The Stanford Cardinal defended their 2016 title by defeating Indiana in golden goal overtime, 1–0, to claim the 2017 championship.

Qualification 

As in previous editions of the NCAA Division I Tournament, the tournament features 48 participants out of a possible field of 203 teams. Of the 48 berths, 24 are allocated to the 21 conference tournament champions and to the regular season winners of the Ivy League, Pac-12 Conference, and West Coast Conference, which do not have tournaments. The remaining 24 berths are supposed to be determined through an at-large process based upon the Ratings Percentage Index (RPI) of teams that did not automatically qualify.

The NCAA Selection Committee also names the top sixteen seeds for the tournament, with those teams receiving an automatic bye into the second round of the tournament. The remaining 32 teams play in a single-elimination match in the first round of the tournament for the right to play a seeded team in the second round.

Of the 24 schools that had previously won the championship, 13 qualified for this year's tournament.

Qualified teams

Seeding

Schedule

Bracket

Regional 1  

Host Institution*

Regional 2 

Host Institution*

Regional 3 

Host Institution*

Regional 4 

Host Institution*

2017 College Cup

Results

First round

Second round

Third round

Quarterfinals

College Cup

Semifinals

national championship

Statistics

Goalscorers 

4 goals

 Mike Catalano — Wisconsin

3 goals

 Sam Gainford — Akron
 Brandon Guhl — Butler

2 goals

 Stuart Holthusen — Akron
 Martin Melchor — Coastal Carolina
 Frantzdy Pierrot — Coastal Carolina
 Paul Marie — FIU
 Jannik Loebe — Fordham
 Tate Schmitt — Louisville
 Jack Hallahan — Michigan
 Robin Schmidt — New Hampshire
 Jelani Pieters — North Carolina
 Sean Bowman — San Francisco
 Bryce Kaminski — San Francisco
 Julio Moncada — UNC Wilmington
 Jon Bakero — Wake Forest
 Tom Barlow — Wisconsin

1 goal

 Marcel Zajac — Akron
 Alex Lehtinen — Butler
 Lewis Suddick — Butler
 Bass Sarr — Cal State Fullerton
 Aravind Sivakumar — California
 Jason Wright — Clemson
 Ryan Bellavance — Colgate
 Karl Brown — Colgate
 Uyi Omorogbe — Colgate
 Aram Ouligian — Colgate
 Jared Stroud — Colgate
 Zach Morant — Columbia
 Kynan Rocks — Columbia
 Matthias Frick — Duke
 Kristófer Garðarsson — Duke
 Max Moser — Duke
 Brian White — Duke
 Deshawon Nembhard — FIU
 Bart Dziedzic — Fordham
 Matthew Lewis — Fordham
 Eric Ohlendorf — Fordham
 Jörgen Oland — Fordham
 Jacob Montes — Georgetown
 Jacob Graiber — Illinois-Chicago
 Grant Lillard — Indiana
 Francesco Moore — Indiana
 Austin Panchot — Indiana
 Cory Thomas — Indiana
 Mason Toye — Indiana
 Walker Andriot — Louisville
 Adrien Cabon — Louisville
 Adam Wilson — Louisville
 Hunter Barone — Michigan State
 Jimmy Fiscus — Michigan State
 DeJuan Jones — Michigan State
 Michael Pimlott — Michigan State
 Ryan Sierakowski — Michigan State
 Jacob Gould — New Hampshire
 Kristian Piippo — New Hampshire
 Mauricio Pineda — North Carolina
 Jack Skahan — North Carolina
 Brandon Perdue — Old Dominion
 Max Wilschrey — Old Dominion
 Bob Groenendijk — Pacific
 Spencer Vue — Pacific
 Habib Barry — Seattle
 Sergio Rivas — Seattle
 Gabriel Ruiz — Seattle
 Christian Boorom — Southern Methodist
 Jordan Cano — Southern Methodist
 Garrett McLaughlin — Southern Methodist
 Leo Folla — St. Francis Brooklyn
 Nadim Saqui — St. Francis Brooklyn
 Tanner Beason — Stanford
 Foster Langsdorf — Stanford
 Ulrik Edvarsen — VCU
 Luc Fatton — VCU
 Marcelo Acuña — Virginia Tech
 Collin Verfurth — Virginia Tech
 Brandon Servania — Wake Forest
 Kyle Coffee — Washington
 Elijah Rice — Washington
 Pepe Martinez-Bertrand — Western Michigan
 Kosti Moni — Western Michigan
 Ben Thornton — Western Michigan
 Ryder Bell — William & Mary
 Mitch Guitar — Wisconsin

Own goals

 Brendan McDonough — Georgetown (playing against Southern Methodist)

Record by conference 

The 1st, R32, R16, QF, SF, F, and NC columns indicate how many teams from each conference were in the first round,  Round of 32, Round of 16, Quarterfinals, Semifinals, Final, and National Champion, respectively.

See also 
 2017 NCAA Division I Women's Soccer Tournament
 2017 NCAA Division I men's soccer season

References 

Championship
NCAA Division I Men's Soccer Tournament seasons
NCAA Division I men's soccer tournament
NCAA Division I men's soccer tournament
NCAA Division I men's soccer tournament